Langat is a surname. Notable people with the surname include:

 Nancy Langat (born 1981), Kenyan middle-distance runner
 Philip Langat (born 1990), Kenyan long-distance road-runner
 Tarık Langat Akdağ (born 1988), Kenyan-born Turkish middle- and long-distance runner born Patrick Kipkirui Langat
 Kiprono Langat, Kenyan politician

See also
 Langat (disambiguation)
 Lagat

Kalenjin names